Edward Taylor (c. 1642–1729) was a colonial American poet, physician, and pastor.

Edward Taylor may also refer to:

Arts and entertainment
 Edward Taylor (music writer) (1784–1863), English singer, writer on music, and Gresham Professor of Music
 Edward R. Taylor (1838–1911), English artist and educator
 Edward Taylor (scriptwriter) (born 1931), writer of the BBC radio comedy series The Men from the Ministry
 Eddie Taylor (1923–1985), American blues guitarist and singer
 Eddie Taylor Jr. (1972-2019), American blues guitarist and singer (son of above)

Politics
 Edward Robeson Taylor (1838–1923), mayor of San Francisco
 E. Leland Taylor (1885–1948), mayor of Louisville, Kentucky
 Edward T. Taylor (1858–1941), U.S. Representative from Colorado
 Edward L. Taylor Jr. (1869–1938), U.S. Representative from Ohio
 Edward Taylor (MP for Canterbury) (1774–1843), British politician
 Teddy Taylor (1937–2017), British politician
 Ted Taylor (politician) (1906–1982), New Zealand lawyer and diplomat

Religion
 Edward Thompson Taylor (1793–1871), American Methodist clergyman
 Edward Taylor (priest) (1921–1982), Archdeacon of Warwick

Science
 Edward Burnett Taylor (1832–1917), British anthropologist
 Edward Harrison Taylor (1889–1978), American herpetologist
 Edward C. Taylor (1923–2017), American chemist

Sports
 Ted Taylor (footballer) (1887–1956), England national football team and Huddersfield Town F.C. goalkeeper
 Edward Taylor (rugby union) (1907–1959), Scottish rugby player
 Edward Taylor (cricketer) (1845–1902), English cricketer

Other
 Edward Taylor (Alamo defender) (1812–1836)
 Edward Thornton Taylor (1850–?), Canadian soldier
 Edward O. Taylor (1912–1984), American bridge player
 E. P. Taylor (1901–1989), Canadian businessman and creator of the gated community

See also
 Ed Taylor (disambiguation)
 Edmund Taylor (disambiguation)
 Edwin Taylor (disambiguation)
 Ted Taylor (disambiguation)